A strongwoman is a woman who performs feats of strength in a show or circus, or a woman who competes in strength athletics. Traditionally, strongwomen have had a special appeal, as women involved in demonstrated feats of strength were exceptions.

Traditional strongwomen
Traditionally, strongwomen were featured as performers in a circus, or in vaudeville, music halls, or other venues, and engaged in feats of strength such as barbell lifting and human juggling.

Some famous traditional strongwomen include:
Miss Athléta (Athleta Van Huffelen), (1865 – 1927) born in Belgium.
Minerva (Josephine Blatt née Wohlford), (1869 – 1923) born in New Jersey.
Vulcana (Miriam Kate Williams aka Kate Roberts), (1874 – 1946) born in Abergavenny, Wales.
Miss Apollina (Elise Gillaine Herbigneaux), (1874 – Unknown) born in Belgium.
Charmion (Laverie Vallee née Cooper), (1875 – 1949) born in Sacramento, California.
Macarte Sisters, a British strongwoman trio act of the late 19th and early 20th-centuries: Julia (1878–1958); Adelaide (1879–1908) and Cecilia (1881–1939)
Marina Lurs (Maria Loorberg), (1881 – 1922) born in Estonia.
Anette Busch, (1882 – 1969) born in Estonia.
Katie Sandwina, (1884 – 1952) born in Vienna, Austria.
Marie Ford, (1900 – Unknown) born in New York.
Ivy Russell, (1907 – Unknown) born in Croydon, England.
Luisita Leers (Martha Luise Krökel), (1909 – 1997) born in Germany.
Mildred Burke, (1915 – 1989) born in Coffeyville, Kansas
Abbye "Pudgy" Stockton, (1917 – 2006) born in Santa Monica, California.
Joan Rhodes, (1920 – 2010) born in London, England.

Modern-day strongwomen

In recent years, the term strongwoman has come to refer to the women who compete in events such as the annual World's Strongest Woman and Arnold Pro Strongwoman competitions, sanctioned by the International Federation of Strength Athletes (IFSA) and Arnold Sports Festival. Strongwomen compete in the sport of Strongman and the sport has become some popular with female strength athletes over the past decade that there are several state and nationally sanctioned competitions that prepare amateur female athletes for national competitions that allow for the opportunity to compete as professionals. In all these contests, the participants compete in similar types of events that can be found in a Strongman competition. Such events include, but are not limited to:
 Deadlift with various implements such as a barbell, axle, loaded frame, car, etc., all of varying weights
 Squat (exercise) – of varying weight, often the barbell or axle is loaded with wagon or truck wheels that are larger than standard weighted plates
 Atlas Stones
 Húsafell Stone
 Loading Medley
 Overhead press using various implements such as an axle, circus dumbbell, log, keg, or block – all of varying weights
 Vehicle pull
 Keg-tossing
 Conan's Wheel
 Farmer's Carry
 Hercules Hold
 Fingal's Fingers
 Tire flip 

Some notable modern strongwomen:

Training 
Women who compete in Strongman (strongwomen) must be well versed in the styles and techniques that are demonstrated in both powerlifting and Olympic weightlifting as the types of lifts that are performed in both sports are fundamental in strength sports and carry over into the techniques that have been developed for the events that make up a Strongman competition. In addition to developing the proper technique for the foundation lifts, strongwomen must also develop endurance through cardiovascular conditioning training. Being able to adapt to implements (straight barbells versus axle barbells, axle barbells versus logs, etc.) is important as the technique used for the different implements are nuanced and are not readily available at commercial gyms.

Competitions 
This is a list of Strongwoman Competitions. Some also include men.
 Maidens of MightStrongwoman Challenge 2019
 California's Strongest Women
 Connecticut's Strongest Man and Woman
 May Flowers of Power Competition
 Central Valley Strongest Man and Woman
 Central Valley Strongest Man and Woman
 War on the Shore Strongman/Strongwoman Classic
 Minnesota State Strongman & Strongwoman Championships
 Texas Strongest Woman

See also
Female bodybuilding
Power training
Sthenolagnia
Strength training
Strongman (strength athlete)

References

External links

Women's sports